Scotia is an ancient name for Scotland.

Scotia may also refer to:

Places

In the United States
 Scotia, Arkansas
 Scotia, California
 Scotia, Missouri
 Scotia, Nebraska
 Scotia, New York
 Scotia, Pennsylvania
 Scotia, South Carolina

Elsewhere
 Scotia, New South Wales
 Scotia Arc, island arc system in the South Atlantic and Southern Oceans
 Scotia Sea, sea bounded by the Scotia Arc islands of the South Atlantic and Southern Oceans
 Scotia Plate, a tectonic plate
 Scotia Sanctuary, New South Wales, Australia
 Scotia's Grave, the reputed resting place of mythological Queen Scotia in Count Kerry, Ireland

Other
 For ships, see List of ships named Scotia
 Scota, or Scotia, in Irish mythology the daughter of an Egyptian Pharaoh
 Scotia (moth), genus of moths of the family Noctuidae
 Scotia, a type of decorative molding
 Scotiabank
 Scotia, a sorceress and primary antagonist in Lands of Lore: The Throne of Chaos

See also
 The Scotian (train), former Via Rail route
 The Scotians, referring to the North Preston's Finest gang
 Nova Scotia, a province of Canada
 Nova Scotia (disambiguation)
 Scottia (disambiguation)
 Scotta, a family surname
 Scotland (disambiguation)
 Caledonia (disambiguation)